AOCE may refer to:

Apple Open Collaboration Environment, the collection of messaging-related technologies introduced for the Mac OS in the early 1990s

See also
 G-AOCE, a plane registration code; see 1958 Channel Airways de Havilland DH.104 Dove crash
 AOC3, amine oxidase, copper containing 3